Nepean High School may refer to:

Nepean High School (Ottawa), Canada
Nepean Creative and Performing Arts High School, Penrith, Australia (formerly known as Nepean High School)